The term Hokonui refers to several things in New Zealand, all directly or indirectly related to the area around the Southland town of Gore:

The Hokonui Hills and the area surrounding them, often simply known as Hokonui or the Hokonuis
Hokonui, New Zealand, a small settlement near Hedgehope
Hokonui (radio network), a radio network based in Gore
Moonshine alcohol
Colloquialism for any alcoholic beverage
Hokonui Moonshine, a present-day (legal) alcohol brand produced by the Southern Distilling Company
Hokonui (New Zealand electorate), a former parliamentary electorate
Hokonui Rūnanga, a constituent part of the Ngāi Tahu Māori tribal area
Hokonui Coal Company